Skate or Die may refer to:
 Skate or Die!, a 1987 video game
 Skate or Die (film), a 2008 French action film
 Gleaming the Cube, a 1989 film also known as Skate or Die
 "Skate or Die", a 2009 episode of Law and Order